This is a list of symbols of the state of New York in the United States. The majority of the state symbols are officially listed in the New York Consolidated Laws in Article 6, Sections 70 through 87.  The symbols are recognized by these laws and were signed into law by the governor of New York.

The oldest symbols, the state flag and the state arms, were adopted in 1778, and the most recent additions to the list, the snapping turtle and lilac bush, were added in 2006. The origin of the state motto dates back to 1784. During a tour of the state's harbors, waterways, and fertile interior, George Washington referred to New York as the "Seat of Empire". The term "The Big Apple" was coined by jazz musicians of the 1930s who used the slang expression "apple" when referring to any city.

The state insect took nine years to become official. In 1980, fifth grader Kristina Savoca sent a letter - along with a petition bearing 152 signatures - to New York State Assemblyman Robert C. Wertz, urging him to introduce legislation designating the lady beetle as the official state insect. The proposal languished for a number of years, passing in the Assembly but not being considered in the Senate. Approval finally came in 1989, after Cornell University entomologists suggested that Wertz propose the nine-spotted lady beetle (Coccinella novemnotata, sometimes abbreviated to C-9) as the state insect because it was a native lady beetle.

Insignia

Flora and fauna

Geology

Culture

See also

List of New York-related topics
Lists of United States state insignia
New York
New York City

References

External links
New York State Information
Top Facts
State symbols and emblems
New York State Symbols

State symbols
New York